The women's High Jump at the 2014 IAAF World Indoor Championships took place on 7–8 March 2014.

Medalists

Records

Qualification standards

Schedule

Results

Qualification
Qualification: 1.95 (Q) or at least 8 best performers (q) qualified for the final.

Final

References

High Jump
High jump at the World Athletics Indoor Championships
2014 in women's athletics